The Hoher Burgstall is a mountain, 2,611 m, in the Kalkkögel mountain chain in the Stubai Alps, southeast of the Schlicker Seespitze (2,804 m) mountain, the tallest in the Kalkkögel. Its summit offers a good view into the Oberbergtal, the upper Stubaital, the Serles ridge and the majority of the Kalkkögel.

Ascents 

The summit is accessible from Starkenburger Hut to the south.

From the north, a rocky gully leads to the top: from the Schlick a well signed path climbs to the Sennjoch saddle. The route continues uphill to the Burgstalljoch and on the path to the Schlicker Scharte wind gap, left through the rock gully to the summit. Alternatively the rock gully can be accessed from the Schlicker Scharte.

The Central Alpine Way 02A runs across the western flank of the Hoher Burgstall.

References

External links 

Stubai Alps
Mountains of Tyrol (state)
Mountains of the Alps
Two-thousanders of Austria